Apsarasa is a genus of moths of the family Noctuidae. The genus was erected by Frederic Moore in 1867.

Species
Apsarasa praslini Boisduval, 1832
Apsarasa radians Westwood, 1848

References

Acronictinae